People's National Convention is the name of several political parties:

People's National Convention (Ghana)
People's National Convention (Sierra Leone)

de:People's National Convention